Kris Newbury (born February 19, 1982) is a Canadian former professional ice hockey forward who is currently playing with the Gananoque Islanders in the Eastern Ontario Super Hockey League

Playing career
Newbury played in the Ontario Hockey League for the Belleville Bulls, and later the Sarnia Sting with whom he would achieve two seasons of 104 and 92 points, in 2001–02 and 2002–03, respectively.

Newbury scored his first goal while a member of the Toronto Maple Leafs on January 1, 2007, against Boston Bruins goalie Tim Thomas.

On February 10, 2007, Newbury ended up in a fight with Ronald Petrovicky, of the Pittsburgh Penguins. He took several punches to the head and was knocked to the ice, giving him a concussion, which caused him to miss the remainder of the season.

On July 7, 2009, Newbury was signed by the Detroit Red Wings organization for the 2009–10 season. After initially starting the year with AHL affiliate, the Grand Rapids Griffins, on December 14, 2009, Newbury scored his first goal as a member of the Detroit Red Wings against the Phoenix Coyotes. On March 3, 2010, Newbury was traded by the Wings to the New York Rangers for forward Jordan Owens he was then assigned to affiliate the Hartford Wolfpack.

On June 16, 2010, he re-signed with the Rangers on a two-year contract.

On January 31, 2011, the New York Rangers recalled Newbury from the Connecticut Whale to the NHL.  He was returned to the Whale on February 3, having scored one assist in eight games with the Rangers.

On March 23, 2013, the Rangers once again recalled Newbury from Connecticut.  After being returned to Connecticut he was recalled again on April 26, 2013.

On July 1, 2013, the Rangers traded Newbury to the Philadelphia Flyers in exchange for defenseman Danny Syvret. In the 2013–14 season, Newbury was reassigned on loan from AHL affiliate, the Adirondack Phantoms, to the Hershey Bears on March 12, 2014.

On July 4, 2014, Newbury was signed as a free agent to a one-year, two-way contract with the Bears NHL affiliate, the Washington Capitals. Following his second season with the Bears Newbury had off-season back surgery. Despite this he quickly signed a new contract to play for the Los Angeles Kings AHL affiliate, the Ontario Reign. In the 2015–16 season, Newbury contributed with 10 goals and 26 points in 44 games.

As an unsigned free agent over the following summer, Newbury initially signed a contract to play in the ECHL with the Reading Royals. After making his Royals debut to begin the 2016–17 season, Newbury agreed to a professional try-out contract to return to the AHL with the Bakersfield Condors on October 18, 2016. Despite registering 3 goals in 14 games with the Condors, Newbury was released at the conclusion of his try-out tenure. The following day he continued in the AHL by signing a PTO with the Charlotte Checkers on November 29, 2016. He played out the season with the Checkers, posting 8 goals and 15 points in 38 games.

After 14 professional seasons in North America, Newbury signed his first contract abroad in agreeing to a one-year deal with German outfit, the Fischtown Pinguins of the Deutsche Eishockey Liga (DEL), on June 29, 2017.

On August 16, 2018, it was announced that Newbury would be returning to North America after signing a standard player contract with the Brampton Beast of the ECHL for the 2018–19 season. After reporting for training camp with the Beast, Newbury was placed on waivers and subsequently claimed to add experience to the Jacksonville Icemen on October 14, 2018.

Career statistics

Regular season and playoffs

International

References

External links
 

1982 births
Living people
Adirondack Phantoms players
Bakersfield Condors players
Belleville Bulls players
Canadian ice hockey centres
Charlotte Checkers (2010–) players
Connecticut Whale (AHL) players
Detroit Red Wings players
Fischtown Pinguins players
Grand Rapids Griffins players
Hartford Wolf Pack players
Hershey Bears players
Ice hockey people from Ontario
Jacksonville Icemen players
New York Rangers players
Ontario Reign (AHL) players
Pensacola Ice Pilots players
Philadelphia Flyers players
Reading Royals players
St. John's Maple Leafs players
San Jose Sharks draft picks
Sarnia Sting players
Sportspeople from Brampton
Toronto Maple Leafs players
Toronto Marlies players
Canadian expatriate ice hockey players in Germany